Fleri is a surname. Notable people with the surname include:

 Diane Fleri (born 1983), French-born Italian actress
 Vaclava Fleri (1888–1983), Lithuanian painter